Howard Paul Hartley (September 26, 1924 – September 29, 2006) was an American football running back and defensive back in the National Football League for the Washington Redskins and the Pittsburgh Steelers.

He played college football at Duke University, on the 1943, 1946, and 1947 teams. He played in the NFL from 1948 through 1952.

References

1924 births
2006 deaths
People from Ravenswood, West Virginia
American football running backs
Duke Blue Devils football players
Washington Redskins players
Pittsburgh Steelers players